Andreas Wieczorek (born 14 January 1974) is a retired German football midfielder.

References

External links
 

1974 births
Living people
German footballers
Bundesliga players
VfL Bochum players
VfB Lübeck players
Eintracht Braunschweig players
SV Elversberg players
Place of birth missing (living people)
Association football midfielders